Henry Aitken Wise (28 December 1835 – 16 June 1922) was a notable New Zealand stationer, printer and publisher. He was born in Edinburgh, Midlothian, Scotland in 1835.

References

1835 births
1922 deaths
New Zealand publishers (people)
Stationers (people)
Publishers (people) from Edinburgh
Scottish emigrants to New Zealand